Tan Tiwu (9 October 1902 – 10 February 1997) was a Chinese politician. She was among the first group of women elected to the Legislative Yuan in 1948.

Biography
Originally from Changsha in Hunan Province, Tan graduated from Peking University Law School in 1926. While a student she was involved with the May Thirtieth Movement and was present at the March 18 Massacre. She subsequently worked as an inspector for the Ministry of Internal Affairs from 1930 to 1945.

In the 1948 elections for the Legislative Yuan, she was a Kuomintang candidate in Hunan province and was elected to parliament. Her membership of the Legislative Yuan was cancelled in 1951.

During the Anti-Rightist Campaign, she was labelled a rightist in 1957 and was removed from all of her posts except membership of the Beijing municipal committee of the RCCK. She was delisted as a rightist in November 1960 and reinstated to the State Council in 1962. She was a member of the fifth and eighth National Committee of the CPPCC and a member of the Standing Committee of the sixth and seventh CPPCC. She died in Beijing in 1997.

References

1902 births
1997 deaths
National University of Peking alumni
Chinese civil servants
20th-century Chinese women politicians
Members of the Kuomintang
Members of the 1st Legislative Yuan
Members of the Revolutionary Committee of the Chinese Kuomintang
Delegates to the 1st National People's Congress
All-China Women's Federation people